The history of rail transport in Ireland began only a decade later than that of Great Britain. By its peak in 1920, Ireland had 3,500 route miles (5,630 km). The current status is less than half that amount, with a large unserviced area around the border area between Northern Ireland and The Republic of Ireland.

Railways on the island of Ireland are run by Iarnród Éireann (Irish Rail) within Ireland and Northern Ireland Railways within Northern Ireland. The two companies jointly operate the island's only cross-border service, the Enterprise, between Dublin and Belfast. The Railway Preservation Society of Ireland based in Whitehead, County Antrim runs preserved steam trains on the main line, with the Irish Traction Group preserving diesel locomotives, and operating on the main line. The Downpatrick & County Down Railway is the only self-contained full-size heritage railway in the island of Ireland.

Transport before railways
Transport on a country-wide scale began in 1710 with the introduction by the General Post Office of mail coaches on the main routes between towns. Private operators added to the routes, and an established "turnpike" road system started in the 1730s. In 1715 the Irish Parliament took steps to encourage inland navigation, but it was not until 1779 that the first 19 km (12 mi) section of the Grand Canal was opened. The addition of the Royal Canal and river navigation (particularly on the River Shannon) meant that freight could be transported more easily. Charles Bianconi established his horse-car services in the south in 1815, the first of many such passenger-carrying operations. Despite these improvements huge areas of Ireland still relied on a basic road system; turnpikes were still slow and canals were expensive.

Ireland's first railway

Although a railway between Limerick and Waterford had been authorised as early as 1826 (the same year as Britain's first exclusively locomotive-drawn line, the Liverpool and Manchester Railway) it was not until 1834 that the first railway was built, the Dublin and Kingstown Railway (D&KR) between Westland Row in Dublin and Kingstown (Dún Laoghaire), a distance of 10 km (6 mi). Due to local opposition the first terminus, Kingstown Harbour, was adjacent to the West Pier. It took a further three years before the line reached the site of the present station.
The contractor was William Dargan, called "the founder of railways in Ireland", due to his participation in many of the main routes. The D&KR was notable in being the earliest dedicated commuter railway in the world. The planning undertaken was also noteworthy: a full survey of the existing road traffic was made, in addition to careful land surveys.

As well as the traffic survey showing existing volumes to be healthy, there was the potential from the ever-expanding port at Kingstown. On 9 October 1834 the locomotive Hibernia brought a train the full route from the Westland Row terminus (now Dublin Pearse) to Kingstown.

The entire route forms part of the present day Dublin Area Rapid Transit electrified commuter rail system.

Railway gauges

The track gauge adopted by the mainline railways is 5 ft 3 in, or "Irish gauge".  This unusual gauge is otherwise found only in the Australian states of Victoria, southern New South Wales (as part of the Victorian rail network) and South Australia (where it was introduced by the Irish railway engineer F. W. Sheilds), and in Brazil.

The first three railways all had different gauges: the Dublin and Kingstown Railway, ; the Ulster Railway, ; and the Dublin and Drogheda Railway, .

Main line railways
By the beginning of the 20th century, the main line railways were:

Belfast and County Down Railway

The Belfast and County Down Railway (B&CDR) linked Belfast south-eastwards into County Down. It was incorporated in 1846; the first section opened in 1848; absorbed into the Ulster Transport Authority in 1948 and all but the line to Bangor closed in 1950.

Cork, Bandon and South Coast Railway

The Cork, Bandon and South Coast Railway (CB&SCR) was one of the major Irish railways; incorporated 1845, the first section opened 1851. It operated from Cork, serving towns along the southern coastal strip to the west of the city. It had a route length of 150 km (93.75 mi), all single line. The Railway was largely concerned with tourist traffic, and there were many road car routes connecting with the line, including one from Bantry to Killarney called The Prince of Wales Route, which operated at the beginning of the 20th century.

The Clonakilty Extension Railway 14 km (8.75 mi), opened 1886, was worked by the CB&SCR

County Donegal Railways Joint Committee

The County Donegal Railways Joint Committee (CDRJC) operated in north-west Ireland during the 20th century. The parent line opened 1863, 178 km (111 mi) (narrow gauge). It was incorporated by an Act of Parliament in 1906 which authorised the joint purchase of the then Donegal Railway Company by the Great Northern Railway of Ireland and the Midland Railway Northern Counties Committee.

The Strabane and Letterkenny Railway 31 km (19.5 mi), opened 1909, was worked by the CDRJC

Dublin and South Eastern Railway

The Dublin and South Eastern Railway (D&SER) was originally incorporated, by Act of Parliament in 1846, as the Waterford, Wexford, Wicklow and Dublin Railway Company; incorporated 1846, the first section opened 1856. It was known more simply as the Dublin, Wicklow and Wexford Railway Company between 1860 and 31 December 1906 when it became the DSE. Amongst the lines forming the DSE were:
The Dublin and Kingstown Railway authorised 1831, it opened in 1834 – the first public railway in Ireland. The Kingstown-Dalkey section was operated by atmospheric traction for a short while. The railway formed part of the Royal Mail route between London and Dublin via the packet station at Kingstown (now Dún Laoghaire).
The City of Dublin Junction Railway 2 km (1.25 mi), opened 1 May 1891, the Dublin and Kingstown Railway 10 km (6 mi); opened 1834, and the New Ross and Waterford Extension Railway 22 km (13.5 mi); opened 1904 were all worked by the D&SER.

Great Northern Railway of Ireland

 
The route of the Great Northern Railway of Ireland (GNR(I)), which exists today from Dublin to Belfast and Drogheda to Navan, emerged, like so many others of the former major railway companies in Ireland, as the result of many amalgamations with smaller lines. The earliest dates of incorporation were for:
The companies forming the Dublin to Belfast line and those connecting to it were obliged to contribute part of this cost.
 the Dublin and Drogheda Railway (D&D), also incorporated 1839, opened in 1844.
 the Irish North Western Railway (INWR), incorporated in 1862 in a merger between the Dundalk and Enniskillen Railway and the Londonderry and Enniskillen Railway, operated from Dundalk and Portadown via Enniskillen and Omagh to Derry.
 the Dublin and Belfast Junction Railway (D&BJct), incorporated in 1845 and opened in stages between 1849 and 1853.

In 1875, the D&D and the D&BJct merged to form the Northern Railway of Ireland and thirteen months later the Great Northern Railway (Ireland) (GNR(I)) was formed when the Ulster Railway and the INWR joined this concern. Other minor railways were subsequently taken over. At its height, in the thirty or so years prior to World War I, the GNR(I) covered a large area of Ireland between Dublin, Belfast, Derry and Bundoran. By the end of World War II the company was in dire straits. It struggled on until 1953 when it was nationalised by the two Governments, becoming the Great Northern Railway Board.

In 1957, the Government of Northern Ireland unilaterally ordered the GNRB to close most of their lines west of the River Bann within Northern Ireland. This left some useless stubs within the Republic, such as through Pettigo station; 13 km (8 mi) from the border to Bundoran and Monaghan to Glaslough. The Irish Government had no choice but to abandon these stubs. The one exception, which survived until 1965, was the line from Portadown to Derry via Dungannon and Omagh.

The GNRB was abolished on 1 October 1958, when it was split between the Ulster Transport Authority and Córas Iompair Éireann in Northern Ireland and the Republic, respectively. This gave rise to the interesting situation whereby part of the line between Strabane and Derry was in the Republic of Ireland and the stations and permanent way staff on this section were CIÉ employees, even though there was no physical link to the rest of the CIÉ rail network.

The Castleblayney, Keady and Armagh Railway 29 km (18.25 mi), opened in 1909 was worked by the GNR(I)

Great Southern & Western Railway

Still known today as the 'premier line', the Great Southern & Western Railway (GS&WR) was the largest railway system in Ireland. It began as a railway incorporated to connect Dublin with Cashel – incorporated 6 August 1844 – and which was afterwards extended to the city of Cork. Various other amalgamations took place until the end of the 19th century, among them lines to Limerick and Waterford.

In 1900, as a result of Acts of Parliament, several important lines became part of the GS&WR system, including the Waterford & Central Ireland Railway and the Waterford, Limerick and Western Railway. The latter connected Sligo to Limerick. The Railway also connected with the Midland Great Western Railway main line at Athlone on its Dublin–Galway main line.

The Athenry and Tuam Extension Light Railway 27 km (17 mi), Baltimore Extension Light Railway 13 km (8 mi), Tralee and Fenit Railway 13 km (8 mi); opened 1887 and Waterford, New Ross and Wexford Junction Railway 5 km (3.25 mi) (leased from D&SER) were worked by the Great Southern & Western Railway.

Midland Great Western Railway

The Midland Great Western Railway main line connected Dublin to Galway and Clifden via (Athlone); there were a number of branch lines:
 Kingscourt via Navan,
 Nesbitt Junction (near Enfield) to Edenderry,
 Sligo, with further branches to Cavan Town and Ballaghaderreen,
 Westport with further branches to Achill,  Ballinrobe and Killala via Ballina in County Mayo,
 Attymon Junction to Loughrea.
The Railway was first incorporated in 1845.

Both the Ballinrobe and Claremorris Railway 19 km (12 mi), opened 1892 and the Loughrea and Attymon Light Railway 14 km (9 mi), opened 1890 were worked by the Midland Great Western.

Northern Counties Committee

The Northern Counties Committee (Midland Railway) was an amalgamation of the Midland Railway with the Belfast and Northern Counties Railway which was formed on 1 July 1903.

Additionally, the Carrickfergus Harbour Junction Light Railway 2 km (1 mi); was incorporated in 1882, opening in 1887 and was worked by the Northern Counties Committee.

Other railways

Independent railways
Ballycastle Railway 26 km (16.25 mi) ( gauge); incorporated 1878, opened 1880; four locomotives, 74 other vehicles
Bessbrook and Newry Tramway (electric) 3 miles (5 km) ( gauge); incorporated 1884; one locomotive, 24 other vehicles
Castlederg and Victoria Bridge Tramway 12 km (7.25 mi); ( gauge); incorporated 1883, opened 1884; three locomotives, 34 other vehicles; closed 1933
Cavan and Leitrim Light Railway 78 km (48.5 mi); ( gauge); incorporated 1883, opened 1888; nine locomotives, 167 other vehicles
Cavehill and Whitewell Tramway 6 km (3.75 mi)
Clogher Valley Railway 59 km (37 mi)( gauge); incorporated 1884, opened 1887; seven locomotives, 127 other vehicles; closed 1942
Clonakilty Extension Light Railway 14 km (8.75 mi); ( gauge); incorporated 1881, opened 1886
Cork and Macroom Direct Railway 38 km (24.5 mi); incorporated 1861, opened 1866; four locomotives, 132 other vehicles
Cork and Muskerry Light Railway (C&MLR) 29 km (18 mi); ( gauge); incorporated 1883, opened 1887; six locomotives, 87 other vehicles
 Donoughmore Extension Railway 14 km (9 mi) (worked by C&MLR) incorporated 1900
Cork, Blackrock and Passage Railway 26 km (16 mi); (originally Irish gauge,  gauge; converted to  gauge in 1900); incorporated 1846, opened 1850; four locomotives, 57 other vehicles
Dublin and Blessington Steam Tramway 25 km (15.5 mi); ( gauge); incorporated 1887, opened 1888; four locomotives, 46 other vehicles
Dublin and Lucan Electric Railway 1900–1925, 11 km (7 mi); ( gauge), 37 vehicles. Opened in 1880 as the Dublin and Lucan Steam Tramway ( gauge). Operated by the DUTC 1928–1940 as part of the Dublin tram system; ( gauge)
Dundalk, Newry and Greenore Railway (London and North Western Railway) 42 km (26.5 mi); incorporated 1863; six locomotives, 230 other vehicles
Giant's Causeway, Portrush and Bush Valley Railway & Tramway 13 km (8 mi); ( gauge); incorporated 1880; two locomotives, 23 other vehicles
Listowel and Ballybunion Railway 16 km (10 mi); (Monorail) (Lartigue system); incorporated 1886, opened 1888; three locomotives, 39 other vehicles
Londonderry and Lough Swilly Railway (L&LSR) 133 km (83 mi); ( gauge); opened 1863/1904 extension; 18 locomotives, 311 other vehicles
Letterkenny Railway 26 km (16 mi); worked by L&LSR; opened 1883
Schull and Skibbereen Railway 22 km (14 mi); four locomotives, 61 other vehicles
Sligo, Leitrim and Northern Counties Railway 78 km (49 mi);  gauge; incorporated 1875, opened 1882; 11 locomotives, 228 other vehicles; closed 1957
South Clare Railway 42 km (26 mi); three locomotives, 27 other vehicles
Timoleague and Courtmacsherry Railway (T&CR) 14 km (9 mi); ( gauge); incorporated 1888, opened 1891; two locomotives, 119 other vehicles
Ballinascarthy Railway; worked by T&CR; ( gauge); incorporated 1888, opened 1890
Tralee and Dingle Light Railway 60 km (37.5 mi); ( gauge); incorporated 1884, opened 1891; eight locomotives, 108 other vehicles
Waterford and Tramore Railway 12 km (7.25 mi); incorporated 1851, opened 1853; four locomotives, 32 other vehicles; unique in being the only line to remain unconnected to the rest of the Irish railway. The line closed, under CIÉ, in 1960
West Clare Railway 43 km (27 mi); ( gauge); opened 1887; eight locomotives, 146 other vehicles

The information contained in this section obtained from Railway Year Book 1912 (Railway Publishing Company)

Monorail

The Listowel and Ballybunion Railway was opened in 1888. It was the world's first commercial monorail, named the Lartigue system after Charles Lartigue. It operated between Listowel and Ballybunion in County Kerry until 1924.

A modern-day re-creation of this system operates in Listowel.

The system in the early 20th century
The rail system, both North and South, survived independence unscathed. The Irish Civil War was to take a much heavier toll on the railways in the newly born Irish Free State (Saorstát Éireann), as the Anti-Treaty IRA systematically targeted them and the Free State had to build a network of fortified blockhouses to protect the railways. One of the most spectacular attacks on the infrastructure was the bombing of the Mallow viaduct (see ).

In 1925, the railway companies within Saorstát Éireann were merged to form the Great Southern Railways. This company was amalgamated on 1 January 1945 with the Dublin United Transport Company to form Córas Iompair Éireann.

Partition however, would eventually exact a heavy toll on the cross–border routes (intrinsic to the County Donegal rail network).

World War II also proved costly for the rail system in the Republic. With the war effort, Britain could not spare coal for neutral Ireland. Thus, Irish steam engines often ran on poor quality Irish coal, wood, or not at all. Unsuccessful attempts were even made to burn peat. The deteriorating quality and frequency of service discouraged rail travellers, whose numbers were also diminishing due to steadily increasing emigration.

Dieselisation

Railways in the Republic were converted to diesel locomotive traction early, and swiftly, due to the run down nature of many of the steam engines, lack of coal, and a desire for modernisation. In 1951 CIÉ's first diesel railcars arrived, followed in 1953 by an order for 100 diesel locomotives.

Rationalisation

The entire West Cork Railway network closed, as were most branch lines in the Republic. The main route network survived intact, with a relatively even distribution of cutbacks. The main routes from Dublin to Belfast, Sligo, Galway and the West of Ireland, Limerick, Cork and Kerry, Waterford and Wexford survived. The cross country route from Rosslare to Limerick and onwards to Sligo survived for a time, although services would later cease on almost all the routes. The North Kerry line from Limerick to Tralee survived until the 1970s. One notable closure was that of the Dublin and South Eastern Railway Harcourt Street railway line in Dublin, despite being regarded as an important commuter artery. On 30 June 2004, the majority of the route reopened as part of the new Luas tram system. South of the Sandyford depot, decisions taken by CIÉ and Dún Laoghaire–Rathdown County Council, to sell the trackbed through Foxrock and allow houses to be built on it near Shankill respectively have made integrating this route into the Luas system difficult. After Sandyford the line detours over the Leopardstown roundabout so as to run west around the Leopardstown Racecourse before rejoining the original alignment just north of Carrickmines. The Harcourt Street line had run around the eastern edge of the racecourse, via Silverpark. Remnants of the old Foxrock Station are visible at the back of The Hedgerows in Foxrock. After this detour around Leopardstown Racecourse, the current line runs roughly along the original alignment with some minor detours, particularly prevalent at Laughanstown.

The Luas Green Line currently terminates at Bride's Glen, just north of the viaduct of the same name. It has been proposed to restore the viaduct should it carry the proposed Luas extension to Bray.

In a few years, the Ulster Transport Authority shut down a large network across Ulster, leaving only Belfast to Derry, Dublin and branches to Larne and Bangor. CIÉ, the transport company in the Republic, had no option but to close their end of cross-border routes. Today a large hole remains in the island's rail network, with a distance of 210 km (130 mi) from Derry to Mullingar untouched by railways, and no rail service to large towns such as Letterkenny and Monaghan.

1970s and 1980s
In the 1970s and 1980s, there was a long period without substantial investment in the rail system, with the notable exception of the Dublin Area Rapid Transit (DART), in which the North-South commuter route in and out of Dublin was electrified, and new frequent services have run from July 1984 to the present day. It was intended to expand the service, with routes to the West of the city, but economic conditions militated against this. In fact, the size of the DART fleet remained unaltered until the year 2000.

Also, 1976 saw the introduction of a small fleet of 18 high-speed diesel-electric locomotives built by General Motors Electro-Motive Diesel at La Grange, Illinois. These  units, 071 Class, were capable of speeds of 145 km/h (90 mph) and immediately began operating express services such as the Cork-Dublin line.

A major disaster occurred on 1 August 1980, when 18 people were killed and 62 injured in a rail accident in Buttevant on the main Cork-Dublin line. A train carrying 230 passengers was derailed when it crashed into a siding at 110 km/h (70 mph). The passengers who were most severely injured or killed were seated in coaches with wooden frames. This structure was incapable of surviving a high speed crash and did not come near to the safety standards provided by modern (post 1950s) metal bodied coaches. This accident led to a major review of the national rail safety policy and resulted in the rapid elimination of the wooden-bodied coaches that had formed part of the train.

The decision to purchase a new fleet of modern InterCity carriages based on the British Rail Mark 3 design was quickly made. These coaches, an already well proven design, were built by BREL in Derby, England and, under licence, at CIÉ's own workshops at Inchicore in Dublin between 1980 and 1989. Other carriages to join the fleet in the 1980s were second-hand ex British Rail Mark 2s.

Cutbacks continued in this period: in 1975 the last rural branch line between Attymon Junction and Loughrea was closed, the line between Limerick and Claremorris and a number of local stations on main lines (such as Buttevant) lost their passenger services. Freight closures at the end of the 1980s included the closure of the line to Youghal in County Cork and the removal of the North Kerry line.

1990s rail revival
In the 1990s, the Republic experienced an economic boom (known colloquially as the Celtic Tiger). This allowed substantial investment to be made. 34 new locomotives (designated 201 Class) were purchased from General Motors, including two for Northern Ireland Railways (NIR). New De Dietrich carriages were also purchased for the cross-border 'Enterprise' service. Meanwhile, the route network was upgraded to continuous welded rail (CWR) and old mechanical signalling was replaced by electronic signalling.

In the mid-1990s, the Greater Dublin area continued to experience a population boom. Such commuter trains as existed were ageing slam-door stock on unreliable old locomotives (the better stock was for InterCity use). The DART was limited in terms of capacity and route. New diesel railcars were ordered, and added first to the Kildare suburban route. The route from Clonsilla to Maynooth was double-tracked and further diesel railcars ordered, and the reopening of stations such as Drumcondra. Again, the North-South Dublin route saw new railcars provide services to Dundalk and Arklow. A number of orders were made for new DART carriages, the first for over a decade.

2000s 
The line was electrified and DART services extended in the South East to Greystones in 2000 and on to Malahide on the Northern line.

DART and Commuter stations were also upgraded, allowing access for people with disabilities with new lifts at footbridges and lengthened platforms to accommodate 8-car sets. Extra roads were provided out of Dublin, while the main terminals of Dublin Connolly and Dublin Heuston were upgraded (the latter completed in 2004, doubling its previous capacity). A new railcar servicing depot was built at Drogheda in 2004 (Inchicore continues to be used for locomotives and carriages).

Iarnród Éireann placed orders for 67 InterCity carriages in 2003 and for 150 "regional railcars" (diesel multiple unit) in 2004. These were used to meet the demand on the railways, and all older carriages were retired from revenue service by September 2009. At peak times, capacity was below requirements. It has been seen in recent years that Iarnród Éireann have phased out all locomotive hauled services, other than those using the 67 Mark 4 carriages on the Dublin-Cork Main Line and the Enterprise on the Dublin-Belfast Main Line, with 22000 Class railcars.

Northern Ireland too has experienced recent rail investment. Central Station has been redesigned, and the Bleach Green-Antrim line, a more direct route for trains to Derry, was reopened in 2001 (although this led to the suspension of the Lisburn – Antrim line and the closure of three rural stations). The line to Bangor was relaid. A new railcar fleet has entered service. The single-track line to Derry, north of Coleraine continues to be of a poor standard. A derailment in 2003, caused by cliff-side boulders falling onto the line, closed the route for some time. In the face of long journey times and a frequent (and generally faster) bus service, the route's future remains in some doubt.

In March 2007, as part of the Transport 21 initiative, Docklands railway station opened, the first new station in Dublin city centre since 1891's .

In July 2009, commuter trains began to run from Mallow to Cork, and on part of the reopened Cork to Youghal line to Midleton and to Cobh, a number of stations were opened, and there are plans for more stations on the lines.

All 100 Mark 3 carriages (dating back from 1980-1989) were phased out in September 2009 with capacity being taken up by 22000 Class railcars. Most of the Mark 3 fleet was scrapped between 2013 and 2014 but 11 were purchased by Belmond and converted for use as the Belmond Grand Hibernian in service since April 2016.

2010s
In September 2010 services began from Dunboyne to Dublin Docklands after the redevelopment of 7.5 km section of the old Navan railway line which had been closed in 1963 from Dunboyne to Clonsilla on the Maynooth line. There are proposals for further development of this line to Navan as part of Iarnród Éireann's plans by 2030.

More deliveries of Commuter and InterCity 22000 Class railcars took place from March 2007 until April 2012, when the final deliveries took place. The route west to Kildare was quadrupled between 2007 and 2010.

NI Railways underwent a major investment programme over the past few years, with track upgrades to the line between Belfast and Derry and 20 new trains which replaced the remaining Class 80 and Class 450 rolling stock. The new trains were a development of the existing Class 3000 units, the Class 4000, which entered service in 2011 and 2012.

Until 2013 Ireland was the only European Union state that had not implemented EU Directive 91/440 and related legislation, having derogated its obligation to split train operations and infrastructure businesses; a similar situation exists in Northern Ireland. A consultation on the restructuring of IÉ took place in 2012. The derogation ended on 14 March 2013, when Iarnród Éireann was split in two sectors: Railway Undertaking and Infrastructure Manager. Former Irish Transport Minister Leo Varadkar indicated that any open access private operators would not receive any subsidy to operate.

Future projects
In relation to fleet expansion, orders of DARTs were suspended indefinitely in October 2009, but Dublin suburban routes are almost at capacity.

Some call for the expansion of the rail network in the Republic. The route from Limerick to Waterford is due to have a realistic service for the first time in decades. Nevertheless, this is the only non-Dublin InterCity route in existence. A railway right of way exists from Limerick, up through the west, to Sligo. This has been titled the Western Railway Corridor (WRC) and some see it as a possible counterbalance to investment in Dublin. Phase 1 is complete with the line from Ennis to Athenry open since March 2010. Phases 2 and 3, from Athenry to Tuam, with an extension from Tuam to Claremorris to link up with the Westport/Ballina line to Dublin, are deferred indefinitely. Future proposals would see the line extended to Sligo, where it would also link with Ireland West Airport Knock.

See also

 History of Ireland
 History of rail transport
 History of rail transport in Great Britain
 Rail transport in Ireland
 Diesel Locomotives of Ireland
 Irish Railway Bibliography
 Northern Ireland Railways
 Irish railway accidents
 Armagh rail disaster
 Buttevant Rail Disaster

References

External links
 Photo Survey of Navan's existing former GNR railway line
 Irish Railway News -reporting on all aspects of irish railways
 CIÉ website — background history on transport in Ireland
 Rail Users Ireland – Ireland's National Rail User organisation
 Railway Preservation Society of Ireland (RPSI) – includes short history, important dates, map
 Western Rail Pictures
 Meath on Track campaign
 Railway Clearing House Junction Maps, photographs, location of mining related railways, survey of Attymon Junction to Loughrea trackbed
 Eiretrains – Irish Railways Past & Present

Closed railways in Ireland
Closed railways in Northern Ireland
Ireland
Rail transport in Ireland
Rail transport in Northern Ireland
History of transport in Ireland